Jamshidabad (also Romanized as Jamshīdābād) is a village in Qaleh-ye Mozaffari Rural District, in the Central District of Selseleh County, Lorestan Province, Iran. At the 2006 census, its population was 21, in 4 families.

References 

Towns and villages in Selseleh County